Fun! Fun! Fanfare! (stylized as FUN! FUN! FANFARE!) is the seventh album by the Japanese pop-rock band Ikimono-gakari. It was released on December 24, 2014, and reached number one on the Oricon Albums Chart.

Track list

References

2014 albums
Ikimono-gakari albums
Epic Records albums